Montbrun (Montbrun in Occitan) is a former commune in the Lozère departement in southern France. On 1 January 2017, it was merged into the new commune Gorges du Tarn Causses. Its population was 80 in 2019.

See also
Communes of the Lozère department
Causse Méjean

References

Former communes of Lozère